Timpview High School (THS) is a public secondary school located in Provo, Utah, United States. Timpview is a 6A school and is one of the three high schools in the Provo City School District.  The current principal is Momi Tu'ua.

Academics
Advanced Placement classes offered at Timpview High School include AP Studio Art, AP Chemistry, AP Physics, AP Biology, AP Spanish Language, AP French Language, AP German Language, AP English Literature, AP English Language and Composition, AP Calculus AB, AP Calculus BC, AP Statistics, AP US History, AP US Government and Politics, AP World History, AP Music, AP Psychology, and AP Human Geography. Timpview is also the only public school in Utah to teach a linear algebra class.

Concurrent enrollment
 Timpview High School offered 128 concurrent enrollment courses through Utah Valley University. In addition, many students take concurrent enrollment classes at Brigham Young University, the local college two miles away.

Athletics
Timpview's athletic program offers participation in eleven competitive sports: lacrosse, baseball, basketball, football, golf, swimming, soccer, tennis, track, cross country, and volleyball. In the 2008–09 school year, Timpview won the "All Sports Award" for the 4A classification in Utah.  , the Timpview boys' tennis team has won seven consecutive 4A state tennis championships; its girls' swimming team has won three consecutive 4A championships. In 2008–09, Timpview  won state championships in football, boys' track, and boys' cross country.

PHASE Spectacular Program

In the 1990s, Timpview High School once sponsored a musical theater program called PHASE Spectacular founded by the school teacher Dana Thelon from the Provo School District which stands for Peers Helping Advance Self Esteem using various pop songs and even songs from The Newsies. This program was to help troubled students get through the problems of Elementary School, Middle School and High School, This program has shutdown in 2001 by the Provo School District due to budget cuts.

Filming in Timpview High School

Love, Fall & Order (2019)

During one scene in the Hallmark film Love, Fall and Order 2019. Timpview High School has been renamed to TAFT High School. Also Claire Hart and Patrick Harris are seen having a baking competition and walking in the school hallways and running on the Timpview High School track football field.

The Adventures of Food Boy (2008)

Timpview was the scene for all school-related portion of this movie.

Wildfire at Timpview High School

On Friday, November 6, 2020, a wildfire burned behind the Timpview High School East field behind the school on the Foothills. Police were called about 8:01 PM and firefighters were called on the scene. The fire was about 20 feet by 20 feet when it was called in, but, because of the wind and extreme fire conditions, was slightly larger by the time the fire department arrived. Within an hour, the fire was under control and no injuries happened.

Notable alumni
 Mike Affleck, professional football player in the Arena Football League
Lindsay Arnold, professional ballroom dancer and Dancing with the Stars pro dancer
Bronson Kaufusi, professional football player in the National Football League (NFL)
Mike Lee, United States Senator from Utah
 Stephen Paea, professional football player in the NFL
Dallas Reynolds, professional football player in the NFL
 Matt Reynolds, professional football player in the NFL
 Danny Southwick, professional football player in the Arena Football League
 Branden Steineckert, musician with punk rock band Rancid
 Xavier Su'a-Filo, professional football player in the NFL
 Pita Taumoepenu, professional football player in the NFL
 Harvey Unga, professional football player in the NFL

References

External links

 

Public high schools in Utah
Schools in Utah County, Utah
Buildings and structures in Provo, Utah
1977 establishments in Utah
Educational institutions established in 1977